Bodil Anita Johansson, later surname Jacobson (born 19 August 1954) is a former Swedish figure skater from Malmö.  She competed at the 1972 Winter Olympics.

Results

References

External links
Skatabase profile

Living people
Olympic figure skaters of Sweden
Swedish female single skaters
Figure skaters at the 1972 Winter Olympics
Sportspeople from Malmö
1954 births
20th-century Swedish women